Murray Garvin is an American college basketball coach, formerly the head coach for South Carolina State University.  He became head coach when previous head coach Tim Carter resigned midway through the 2012–2013 season.

Head coaching record

References

Living people
American men's basketball coaches
Charleston Southern Buccaneers men's basketball coaches
College men's basketball head coaches in the United States
High school basketball coaches in the United States
Junior college men's basketball coaches in the United States
South Carolina State Bulldogs basketball coaches
Winston-Salem State Rams men's basketball coaches
Year of birth missing (living people)